Kim Jeong-hyeon, also spelled Kim Jung-hyun, is a Korean name consisting of the family name Kim and the given name Jeong-hyeon, also spelled Jung-hyun.

People with the name:
Kim Jung-hyun (actor, born 1976), South Korean actor
Kim Jeong-hyun (footballer, born 1988), South Korean footballer
Kim Jung-hyun (footballer, born 1990), South Korean footballer
Kim Jeong-hyun (footballer, born 1993), South Korean footballer
Kim Jung-hyun (actor, born 1990), South Korean actor

See also
Kim Jong-hyun (disambiguation)